Carbonnelle is a surname. Notable people with the surname include: 

André Carbonnelle (1923–2015), Belgian field hockey player
Eddy Carbonnelle (1926–2004), Belgian field hockey player
Ignatius Carbonnelle (1829–1889), Belgian Jesuit and mathematician

See also 
 Carbonell (surname)